Hugo Germán Iriarte (born 26 March 1982) is an Argentine football defender. He currently plays for Guillermo Brown.

Career
Iriarte started his career in 2002 with Argentino de Rosario in the Primera B Metropolitana (Argentine third division). In 2003, he joined Newell's Old Boys, where he was part of the squad that won the 2004 Apertura.

In 2005, Iriarte left Newell's to join Colón. In 2008, he left Colón to join Club de Gimnasia y Esgrima La Plata. In 2011, after suffering relegation with Gimnasia, he joined recently promoted Atlético de Rafaela.

Honours
Newell's Old Boys
Argentine Primera División (1): 2004 Apertura

References

External links
 
 Argentine Primera statistics 

1982 births
Living people
Sportspeople from Córdoba Province, Argentina
Argentine footballers
Association football defenders
Newell's Old Boys footballers
Club Atlético Colón footballers
Club de Gimnasia y Esgrima La Plata footballers
Atlético de Rafaela footballers
Argentine Primera División players
Argentino de Rosario footballers